Moyvane GAA is a Gaelic Athletics Association club from Moyvane in north County Kerry, Ireland.  They play in Division 5 of the County League, Kerry Novice Football Championship and North Kerry Senior Football Championship. They also participate in the Kerry Senior Football Championship through the divisional side Feale Rangers.

Honours

 Kerry Novice Football Championship (1):  2006, 2021
 North Kerry Senior Football Championship (18): 1925,1927, 1928, 1929,1930, 1932, 1936, 1937, 1938, 1939, 1958, 1961, 1963, 1964, 1983, 1995, 1999, 2003

Notable players
 Jim Brosnan
 Patrick Curtin
 Bernie O'Callaghan

References

Gaelic football clubs in County Kerry
Gaelic games clubs in County Kerry